Matthew "Matt" Broomall (born April 20, 1994) is an American soccer player who plays as a goalkeeper for the Richmond Kickers in USL League One.

Raised in Somers Point, New Jersey, Broommall attended Mainland Regional High School.

Career

Richmond Kickers
Broomall joined the club for the 2019 season, but only saw inclusion in the matchday squad four times throughout the campaign, none of which resulted in a first team appearance. In January 2020, Broomall re-signed with the Kickers ahead of the 2020 season. He made his league debut for the club on matchday one, coming on as a halftime substitute for Akira Fitzgerald in a 3-2 away defeat to the Greenville Triumph.

Ballymacash Rangers F.C.

Broomall completed a move to Northern Ireland side Ballymacash Rangers F.C. in February 2021.

References

External links
Matt Broomall at Rutgers University Athletics
Matt Broomall at USL League One

1994 births
Living people
Rutgers Scarlet Knights men's soccer players
Mainland Regional High School (New Jersey) alumni
New York Red Bulls U-23 players
Richmond Kickers players
USL League Two players
USL League One players
American soccer players
People from Somers Point, New Jersey
Soccer players from New Jersey
Sportspeople from Atlantic County, New Jersey
Association football goalkeepers
American expatriate soccer players
National Premier Soccer League players
Ballymacash Rangers F.C. players